Domestica (also styled as Cursive's Domestica) is the third studio album by the American indie rock band Cursive, released on June 20, 2000. This album was the 31st release by Saddle Creek Records, released on CD as well as both red and black vinyl.

About
Domestica is a concept album that tells the story of a relationship between two characters named "Sweetie" and "Pretty Baby." Both characters are mentioned by name in several of the songs on the album ("The Casualty," "The Martyr," "A Red So Deep," and "The Radiator Hums") as well as the title of "The Lament of Pretty Baby." It is presumed that the album correlates directly with lead singer and principal songwriter Tim Kasher's divorce, but additional dynamics were added to the story. One is the theme of infidelity, prevalent in the songs "A Red So Deep" and "The Game of Who Needs Who the Worst," a dynamic Kasher says was not present in his marriage. While the ending track is ambiguous, lead singer Tim Kasher said in an interview that the couple stays together, despite their differences and fights. The album is mainly considered emo, post-hardcore and indie rock.

Reception

In 2014, Stereogum named "The Martyr" in their list of "30 Emo Songs: Late 90s & Early 2000s Essentials."

Track listing

Personnel

Cursive 
Tim Kasher - vocals, guitar
Matt Maginn - bass, vocals
Clint Schnase - drums, percussion
Ted Stevens - guitar, vocals

Additional Personnel
AJ Mogis - recording, mixing, mastering
Mike Mogis - recording, mixing, mastering, production
Doug Van Sloun - mastering
Zack Nipper - cover art model for "Sweetie"
Jenn Bernard - cover art model for "Pretty Baby"

References

External links
Cursive official website
Saddle Creek Records

2000 albums
Cursive (band) albums
Saddle Creek Records albums
Albums produced by Mike Mogis
Concept albums